William Davison (born 30 August 1982) is an Australian professional racing driver. He currently drives the No.17 Ford Mustang GT for Dick Johnson Racing in the Repco Supercars Championship. Davison is a two-time winner of the Bathurst 1000, in 2009 and 2016.

Early career
Having won the Victorian title in 2000, Davison won the 2001 Australian Formula Ford Championship, competing against future IndyCar driver Will Power and Leanne Ferrier.

Open-wheel career

European campaign
Taking a common route to Formula One, Davison packed up and moved to Buckinghamshire in England where he competed in the 2002 British Formula Renault Championship, finishing fourth in the series. In 2003 he moved up to the British Formula 3 Championship with Alan Docking Racing but an enforced mid-year change of teams to Menu F3 did not help his campaign. Davison continued with Menu F3 into 2004 but his campaign was cut short for financial reasons.

In 2004 he tested a Minardi Formula One car with fellow Australian Will Power at the Misano World Circuit in Italy, organised by Minardi's Australian team owner, Paul Stoddart.

A1 Grand Prix
During his time between Formula 3 and V8 Supercar seats, Davison drove for A1 Team Australia in the inaugural season of the A1 Grand Prix, where he was once again racing for Alan Docking Racing. During the season he experienced many ups and downs, including being involved in various incidents outside his own control. The positives for the season were two sixth-place finishes in both the Portuguese and Australian feature races.

Touring car career

Team Dynamik
In 2004, Will made his first appearance in Australia's premier touring car series, V8 Supercars, driving a third car for Team Dynamik at Winton. However, it was an inauspicious debut as he only managed to complete a single lap before retiring. He then reappeared in the next round at Oran Park before co-driving with Dale Brede in the endurance events, the Sandown 500 and Bathurst 1000, with the latter event marking his final appearance of the season.

Dick Johnson Racing
In 2005, Will was not able to find a full-time drive. However, he did appear at Sandown and Bathurst, where he drove for Dick Johnson Racing, co-driving with Steven Johnson in the No. 17 Westpoint Falcon. By mid-November 2005, Davison had been signed as a full-time driver for Dick Johnson Racing, set to pilot the team's No. 18 Falcon in 2006.

For Davison, 2006 was a quiet year as Davison was plagued by technical difficulties. He recorded only modest results, with a fourth place with team-mate Steven Johnson at Sandown being his lone highlight. He finished 19th in the championship. In 2007, Davison continued to drive the No. 18 Falcon under the team's new naming rights sponsor, Jim Beam. In the 2007 endurance races, Davison partnered with Steven Johnson for the third straight year, with the duo scoring a third place at Bathurst.  He finished 10th in the championship.

Davison remained at the team to race the No. 18 Falcon in 2008, winning his first championship race and round at Eastern Creek Raceway the second round of 2008. It was the team's first round victory in seven years. Davison also scored a further 2 podiums in the year, one of these with teammate Steven Johnson at the Phillip Island 500. He finished a career-high 5th in championship.

Holden Racing Team

In 2009, Davison moved to the Holden Racing Team to drive the No. 22 Holden VE Commodore. This was Davison's best year to date; he finished 2nd in the championship after collecting a round win at the Sandown Challenge, a race win at Queensland Raceway and a rare endurance double at the Phillip Island 500 and Bathurst 1000, driving with Garth Tander. This provided Davison with his first Bathurst victory. He also scored several other podiums during the year, and won the Barry Sheene Medal at the post-season awards night.

In 2010, Davison continued with HRT, but technical issues and bad luck plagued him throughout the entire year and he finished the championship in 22nd place. Midway through the season, Davison decided to end his relationship with Holden Racing Team and signed with Ford Performance Racing for 2011 to drive the No. 6 Trading Post FPR Falcon.

Ford Performance Racing

2011 saw Davison regain his form as a front runner, with four pole positions and six podiums. Although unable to break through for a win, he ended the season 7th in the championship.

2012 started on a high note: after 11 starts and 6 wins, including winning the Clipsal 500 Adelaide for the first time, Davison was the leader of the series, albeit involved in a very tight battle for the championship with Jamie Whincup and his FPR teammate Mark Winterbottom. However, after a stroke of bad luck in the endurance races, despite scoring his maiden Bathurst 1000 pole position, Davison only managed to finish fourth overall.

2013 once again ended in disappointment for Davison, with a number of racing incidents transpiring to ruin his championship ambitions causing him to finish third in the standings behind the Triple Eight Racing duo of Craig Lowndes and Jamie Whincup.

Erebus Motorsport

Davison confirmed in early 2014 that he would be joining Erebus Motorsport on a four-year contract. Driving a Mercedes-Benz E63 AMG, he finished 14th in 2014 and 15th in 2015, collecting just one win, at the 2015 Ubet Perth Super Sprint, and six top five results. In both years, Davison drove with his brother Alex in the Enduro Cup, narrowly missing a Bathurst podium in 2014. Financial pressures on the team resulted in Davison being given permission in mid-2015 to negotiate a drive elsewhere.

Tekno Autosports

Davison moved to Tekno Autosports in 2016, returning to Holden for the first time since 2010. The move brought Davison near-immediate success, winning the second round of the year, the Tasmania SuperSprint. After a lean patch in the middle of the year, Davison returned to form at the Enduro Cup, finishing third at Sandown with Jonathon Webb. At the Bathurst 1000, Davison achieved an even better result, capitalising on late drama between the race leaders to take his second Bathurst crown, despite not leading any laps.

23Red Racing
Davison contested the Supercars Championship with 23Red Racing from 2018 through to the demise of the team in 2020.

Dick Johnson Racing

In 2020, it was announced that Davison will sign for Dick Johnson Racing in the 2021 Supercars Championship racing alongside Anton de Pasquale.

GT career
Davison has competed multiple times in the Bathurst 12 Hour, with a best result of 3rd in 2014 in an Erebus Motorsport-prepared Mercedes-Benz SLS AMG.

Personal life
His grandfather Lex Davison won the Australian Grand Prix four times and also won the 1957 Australian Drivers' Championship. His father Richard Davison was the winner of the 1980 Australian Formula 2 Championship and his brother Alex Davison has won numerous titles including the 2004 Australian Carrera Cup Championship as well as also competing in Supercars for several years. Continuing the family tradition, cousin James Davison has competed in the IndyCar Series and the Rolex Sports Car Series. His grandmother Diana Davison was one of the first female racing drivers in Australia. His stepgrandfather Tony Gaze was a decorated fighter pilot in World War II and also a Formula One driver. 

Davison is married to Riana Crehan as of early 2020, a pit reporter for Supercars Media.

Career results

Supercars Championship results

Complete Bathurst 1000 results

Complete A1 Grand Prix results
(key) (Races in bold indicate pole position) (Races in italics indicate fastest lap)

References

External links
Will Davison's racing profile

1982 births
A1 Team Australia drivers
Bathurst 1000 winners
British Formula Renault 2.0 drivers
British Formula Three Championship drivers
Formula Ford drivers
Living people
People educated at Xavier College
Racing drivers from Melbourne
Supercars Championship drivers
Motaworld Racing drivers
Alan Docking Racing drivers
Dick Johnson Racing drivers
Audi Sport drivers
W Racing Team drivers
McLaren Racing drivers